This is a listing of the horses that finished in either first, second, or third place and the number of starters in the Laurel Futurity Stakes, an American stakes race for two-year-olds at 1-1/16 miles (8.5 furlongs) on the turf held at Laurel Park Racecourse in Laurel, Maryland.  (List 1921–present)

        

A # designates that the race was run in two divisions in 1922.

See also 

 Laurel Futurity Stakes
 Laurel Park Racecourse

References

External links
Barbaro's win in the 2005 Laurel Futurity
Video at YouTube of Affirmed and Alydar in the 1977 Laurel Futurity
Morvich and the first Pimlico (Laurel) Futurity
Morvich: Autobiography of a Horse in the Internet Archive

Lists of horse racing results
Laurel Park Racecourse